Dinesh Panicker is an Indian film producer, actor and TV producer. He entered the film industry in 1989 by producing Kireedam, a critically acclaimed and commercially successful film. He went on to produce different genre films in Mollywood. Later, he started acting in Malayalam films and serials, and is now the general secretary of ATMA (Association of Television Media Artistes).

Career

Panicker began his film career in 1989 by co-producing Kireedam, which stars Mohanlal and was directed by Sibi Malayil. At first, Panicker wanted to play a small role as the husband of Parvathy's husband but he reconsidered it due to resistance from his wife. He later said he never dared to act in films he produced.

Panicker's second movie was Cheppukilukkana Changathi, a comedy-drama starring Mukesh and Jagadish. In 1995, he produced Boxer, which stars Babu Antony as an action hero.  His next film, Kaliveedu, is a 1996 family drama. That year, he produced Rajaputhran, an action-drama film and the directorial debut of Shajoon Kariyal. It was released in both Tamil and Telugu. Mayilpeelikkavu, a mystery-thriller film, was produced in 1998.

Panicker reunited with Sibi Malayil for a romance film Pranayavarnangal, starring Suresh Gopi, Manju Warrier, Divya Unni and Biju Menon. He produced Mammootty-starrer political conspiracy crime film Stalin Sivadas, which was released in 1999. He tried a new formula in Malayalam films by casting television presenter Koottickal Jayachandran in a lead role in his movie Chirikkudukka. Panicker later started an acting venture in Malayalam films and television serials, and is now general secretary of the Association of Television Media Artistes (ATMA).

Filmography

As producer

Acting credits

Television

References

External links
 

Malayalam film producers
21st-century Indian male actors
Year of birth missing (living people)
Living people
Film producers from Kerala
Male actors from Kerala
Film producers from Kochi
Male actors in Malayalam cinema
Male actors in Malayalam television
Indian television producers